The 2007 Slammiversary (sometimes stylized as SlammiVersary) was a professional wrestling pay-per-view (PPV) event produced by Total Nonstop Action Wrestling, which took place on June 17, 2007, at the Nashville Municipal Auditorium in Nashville, Tennessee. It was the third event under the Slammiversary chronology and marked the fifth anniversary of the promotion. Ten professional wrestling matches were featured on the event's card.

Prior to the main event, Jeff Jarrett held a shoot interview where he discussed the recent death of his wife Jill, who died on May 23, 2007, of breast cancer. Jarrett discussed how she influenced the company during the "early days" followed by saying he doesn't know when or where he'll wrestle again. Jarrett then concluded by thanking the fans for their support on his and his wife's behalf. The fans responded by chanting Jill's name as well as "Thank you Jeff".

In October 2017, with the launch of the Global Wrestling Network, the event became available to stream on demand. It would later be available on Impact Plus in May 2019.

Results

King of the Mountain match statistics

Notes
Celebrity guests in attendance for Slammiversary 2007 included LeVar Woods, Zach Piller, Jason Matthews, Vanilla Ice, Rocket Ismail, Johnny Fairplay, Josh Haynes, Francesco Quinn, Michelle Deighton, Dan Clark, Kenny Bartram, Jake Bell, Dr. Justin Davis, Judge Adam Pate, Aaron Severns, Brian Canter, Chris Newman, Craig Newman and "Filthy" Rich Lawson. Nathan Nease was not in attendance.

References

External links
 TNAWrestling.com - the official website of Total Nonstop Action Wrestling

Slammiversary
Events in Nashville, Tennessee
2007 in Tennessee
Professional wrestling in Nashville, Tennessee
June 2007 events in the United States
2007 Total Nonstop Action Wrestling pay-per-view events